"Signs"  is a song by American West Coast hip hop recording artist Snoop Dogg. It was released in United States and United Kingdom on April 25, 2005. The song is the third single released from Snoop Dogg's seventh studio album, R&G (Rhythm & Gangsta): The Masterpiece (2004). The song was produced by The Neptunes and features guest appearances by Charlie Wilson and Justin Timberlake.

The edited version of the song is used for the 2005 film Guess Who which stars Ashton Kutcher and Bernie Mac. The song is played once during the film and again during the end credits.

Themes
The song looks at the topic of romance from several points of view, and in doing so, touches on other subjects such as illegal drugs, the city of Los Angeles, the perceived glamour of gang culture, and the lavish, hedonistic lifestyle led by many rappers and musicians.

The chorus, sung by Justin Timberlake, is about the moment when a man thinks a woman to whom he is sexually attracted may also be attracted to him. The man second-guesses what he thinks he has seen, expressing a wish that love (personified as Cupid in classical fashion) should not play around with his emotions. Meanwhile, another male observer (voiced by Snoop Dogg) opines that the Timberlake character is out of his element and should not bother attempting to further relations between himself and the object of his affection, since he lacks the necessary gangster credentials.

The verses of the song, rapped by Snoop Dogg, mainly following Snoop Dogg's attempts to charm a woman or women. The first verse starts with a brief introduction boasting about the song's hit potential, due to the involvement of Snoop himself and producers the Neptunes. Snoop then appears to become distracted by a passing woman, and attempts to charm her by offering to procure cannabis for her and mentioning his gang, the Crips. In the second verse, Snoop boasts about the glamorous side of his home city, Los Angeles. In the third verse (or bridging section), he redoubles his efforts at seduction by promising his interlocutor a flight on a private jet to London and the holiday resorts of Ibiza and watching Venus and Serena Williams in the Wimbledon tennis championships.

Charlie Wilson then provides a more experienced point of view on love, advising all concerned not to be foolish, to appreciate what they have, and not to be distracted by "a pretty face". This implies that the Timberlake and Snoop characters may already be in relationships, and are considering infidelity with the women mentioned in the song.

The song's three vocalists thus show three stages of a man's romantic life: Timberlake as the young ingenue; Snoop Dogg as the Casanova in his prime; and Wilson as the experienced older man dispensing advice to his younger companions.

Music video
The music video was directed by Paul Hunter and takes place in an underground boxing gym and at a casino in Las Vegas, Nevada. It was the most played video on the UK version of The Box in 2005.

Reception
The single reached number two on the UK Singles Chart in May 2005 and number 46 on the U.S. Billboard Hot 100 chart. However, it was more popular in Australia staying at No. 1 on the Australian Singles Chart for two weeks.

It was performed by Snoop Dogg at the Live 8 concert in London on July 2, 2005, along with a few of his other hits.

The song interpolates some lyrics from The Gap Band's 1982 "Early in the Morning" and Cheryl Lynn's 1978 "Got to Be Real".

Critical reception
David Jeffries highlighted and praised: "The up-tempo "Signs" with Justin Timberlake is glittery disco fun, but it ain't gonna keep Snoop from being himself." RapReviews described: "look for him sharing the spotlight with Snoop and Justin Timberlake on "Signs," although the D-oh-double-G still steals the show:

"It's legit, you know it's a hit
When the Neptunes and the Doggy Dogg fin' to spit
You know he's in - tune with the season
Come here baby, tell me why you leavin?
Tell me if it's weed that you need
If you wanna breathe, I got the best weed minus seeds
Ain't nobody trippin, V.I.P. they can't get in
If somethin go wrong then you know we get to crippin"

Justin Timberlake does crip-hop? Sounds wrong, but it comes out just right."

Charts

Weekly charts

Year-end charts

Certifications

Release history

References

 Rock on the Net
 Music Video Database

External links
 Music video on Dailymotion

2004 songs
2005 singles
Charlie Wilson (singer) songs
Justin Timberlake songs
Music videos directed by Paul Hunter (director)
Number-one singles in Australia
European Hot 100 Singles number-one singles
Snoop Dogg songs
Songs written for films
Song recordings produced by the Neptunes
Songs written by Pharrell Williams
Songs written by Chad Hugo
Songs written by Snoop Dogg